Justus Lehto (born 6 April 1997) is a Finnish professional footballer who plays for  PS Kemi, as a midfielder.

References

1997 births
Living people
Finnish footballers
FC Jazz players
Kemi City F.C. players
Veikkausliiga players
Ykkönen players
Kakkonen players
Association football midfielders